Eric de Oliveira Pereira (born 5 December 1985), known as Eric, is a Brazilian-Romanian former professional footballer who played as an attacking midfielder.

After starting out his career in native Brazil, he went on to amass numerous stints in Romania, Ukraine, Saudi Arabia, Japan and Qatar. He achieved most success in Romania, representing in the country Gaz Metan Mediaș, Pandurii Târgu Jiu, Viitorul Constanța and Voluntari.

With 66 goals in the Liga I, Eric has been the top foreign goalscorer of the Romanian championship since 2020. Previously, he was named the Foreign Player of the Year twice, in 2010 and 2013.

Career

Early career / Gaz Metan Mediaș
Eric de Oliveira started his professional career in Brazil at Metropolitano. He was loaned by Metropolitano to Gaz Metan Mediaș in the 2007–08 Liga II season, a season in which he scored 10 goals helping the team to gain promotion to Liga I. After that season, Gaz Metan bought him from Metropolitano.

In his first Liga I season, he played in 25 games and scored 3 goals. In the following campaign, he played in 30 games and scored 8 goals. In the 2010–11 season, he played in 31 games and scored 15 goals, helping the team finish in the 7th place in Liga I, a place that gained Gaz Metan's first ever qualification to the UEFA Europa League, due to Politehnica Timișoara, who finished 2nd in the league table, being relegated by the Romanian Football Federation for not fulfilling the licence conditions to play in European competitions or Liga I. He was awarded the Liga I Foreign Footballer of the Year individual trophy in 2010.

In the 2011–12 campaign, he made his debut in European competitions playing both legs against KuPS. Shortly after moved to Ukraine after signing with Karpaty Lviv. He played 6 games there and returned to Gaz Metan after that season. In the 2012–13 season, he was named Gaz Metan's captain and played in 22 games and scored four goals.

Pandurii Târgu Jiu / Al-Ahli
In July 2013, Eric de Oliveira signed a three-year contract with Pandurii Târgu Jiu, the Liga I runner-up, following his former coach from Gaz Metan, Cristian Pustai. With Pandurii, he advanced to the group stage of Europa League, participating in 8 matches. On 13 September 2013, Eric scored the winning goal in the 2-1 victory against Dinamo București. The following week, he scored the only goal of Pandurii in the 1-1 draw against CFR Cluj.

In January 2014, Eric transferred to Al-Ahli from Jeddah, Saudi Arabia, a team contending in the Saudi Professional League and runner up for last year's Asian Champions League. In January 2015, he returned to Pandurii Târgu Jiu.

Late career
On 30 June 2015, Matsumoto Yamaga announced the signing of Eric de Oliveira from Romanian club Pandurii Târgu Jiu. On 8 July 2017, Eric signed a one-year contract with Liga I club Viitorul Constanța.

On 12 January 2019, Eric de Oliveira signed a one-and-a-half-year contract with Viitorul Constanța. On 14 January 2020, Eric left Viitorul Constanța and signed a one-and-a-half-year contract with Liga I side Voluntari. On 8 January 2021, Eric was released from the club after having his contract mutually terminated.

On 19 February 2021, Eric de Oliveira signed a six-month contract with Gaz Metan Mediaș.

Personal life
In July 2011, Eric and Romanian handball player Cosmina Dancu had their first son, whom they named Deric. Eric married Cosmina two years later. Their second son, Anthony, was born in 2015.

Eric's cousin, Vitinho, was also a professional footballer and played for Gaz Metan Mediaș.

Honours
Al-Ahli
King Cup runner-up: 2014

Pandurii Târgu Jiu
Cupa Ligii runner-up: 2014–15

Viitorul Constanța
Cupa României: 2018–19
Supercupa României: 2019

Individual
Gazeta Sporturilor Foreign Player of the Year in Romania: 2010, 2013

Records
Foreign top goalscorer in Liga I: 66 goals

References

External links

1985 births
Living people
People from Nova Iguaçu
Brazilian footballers
Association football midfielders
Liga I players
Liga II players
Ukrainian Premier League players
Saudi Professional League players
J1 League players
Qatar Stars League players
Qatari Second Division players
Clube Atlético Metropolitano players
CS Gaz Metan Mediaș players
FC Karpaty Lviv players
CS Pandurii Târgu Jiu players
Al-Ahli Saudi FC players
Matsumoto Yamaga FC players
Najran SC players
FC Viitorul Constanța players
Al-Markhiya SC players
FC Voluntari players
Brazilian expatriate footballers
Expatriate footballers in Romania
Brazilian expatriate sportspeople in Romania
Expatriate footballers in Ukraine
Brazilian expatriate sportspeople in Ukraine
Expatriate footballers in Saudi Arabia
Brazilian expatriate sportspeople in Saudi Arabia
Expatriate footballers in Japan
Brazilian expatriate sportspeople in Japan
Expatriate footballers in Qatar
Brazilian expatriate sportspeople in Qatar
Romanian people of Afro-Brazilian descent
Naturalised citizens of Romania
Sportspeople from Rio de Janeiro (state)